David Ernest Charles (born 2 March 1948) is a former Australian politician. Born in Melbourne, he was a film and television director before entering politics. In 1980, he was elected to the Australian House of Representatives as the Labor member for Isaacs. He held the seat until his retirement in 1990. On leaving the parliament, Charles served a term as Consul-General in San Francisco (1990–1993).

References

Australian Labor Party members of the Parliament of Australia
Members of the Australian House of Representatives for Isaacs
Members of the Australian House of Representatives
1948 births
Living people
Australian film directors
Consuls-General of Australia in San Francisco
20th-century Australian politicians
Politicians from Melbourne